Tucotuzumab celmoleukin is an anti-cancer drug. It is a fusion protein of a humanized monoclonal antibody (tucotuzumab) and an interleukin-2 (celmoleukin).

This drug was developed by EMD Pharmaceuticals.

References 

Monoclonal antibodies for tumors
Antibody-drug conjugates